Federal Highway 14D is a toll highway in the state of Michoacán. It connects Highway 15D at Cuitzeo to 37D and Uruapan via the city of Pátzcuaro. The road is operated by Autopistas de Michoacán, which charges cars 171 pesos to travel Highway 14D from Cuitzeo to Uruapan and 478 pesos when combined with Highway 37D to Lázaro Cárdenas.

Highway 14D from Pátzcuaro southwest, along with Highway 37D, are together referred to as the Autopista Siglo XXI.

History
The segment from Cuitzeo to Pátzcuaro, bypassing the major city of Morelia, was formally opened by President Enrique Peña Nieto on October 20, 2016, after construction had started in 2012 and six months after opening to traffic on April 14. The concession for this  segment is held by PINFRA, Blackrock, AZVI and Sociedad Michoacana.

References

External links
Autopistas Michoacán website

Mexican Federal Highways